i24NEWS is an Israeli-based international 24-hour news television channel located in Jaffa Port, Tel Aviv, Israel. It broadcasts in French, English, and Arabic. English channel offers a weekly magazine in Spanish. The channel's owner is Patrick Drahi, and the CEO is Frank Melloul.

In February 2017, i24NEWS expanded into the North American market and opened bureaus in the United States. The channel has studios in Tel Aviv-Jaffa, Paris, New York, Washington and Los Angeles, and deploys correspondents in other locations across the world. In September 2021, following the Abraham Accords, the channel received a broadcasting license from the United Arab Emirates and opened its Gulf bureau in Dubai Media City. In May 2022, the channel launched its operations in Morocco with two new bureaus in Rabat and Casablanca.

History 
The channel went live on 17 July 2013. Melloul stated that it would battle prejudice and ignorance about Israel with "facts and diversity."

Arab Israeli journalist Lucy Aharish was the lead anchor of the English-language branch of the channel from July 2013 until she left in January 2016.

On 8 December 2016 all programming on the English channel officially ended in preparation for launching in America. The channel broadcast 10 minutes of news on the Hour from 8 am to 11 pm (local time) and replaced "Morning Edition", "The Daily Beat" and "The Lineup" with a 26-minute news bulletin, repeated at half past.

The launch of i24NEWS in the United States was announced on 27 January 2017. The channel is operated out of its headquarters in Jaffa.

Live programming in the US is broadcast from Times Square in New York with an additional bureau in Washington, DC. Approximately 50 journalists were hired to staff the two locations. The channel uses resources from its Jaffa headquarters.

Among the first journalists hired were Michelle Makori, anchor and editor-in-chief, David Shuster who is also a managing editor and Dan Raviv (a 40+ year veteran of CBS News). The channel acquired many of its debut behind-the-scenes talent from the former Al Jazeera America.

Haaretz, in a report on 2 December 2019, indicated that i24NEWS, in order to secure an English broadcast license, gave Benjamin Netanyahu more positive coverage. The channel denied the allegations.

In 2020, following the Abraham Accords, i24NEWS signed a various of MoU and partnership agreements with leading companies in the UAE. i24NEWS became the first Israel-based channel to be broadcast in the UAE. In 2021 the channel received a UAE broadcast license and launched its studios in Dubai Media City, the regional hub for media organizations in the Gulf. 

In 2022, i24NEWS launched its operations in Morocco and the opening of two bureaus in Rabat and Casablanca, from which the channel operates its studios.

Visual identity

Distribution 
i24NEWS started broadcasting in Israel on August 29, 2018. It is offered in France (including the French West Indies), Belgium, Luxembourg, Switzerland, Italy, Spain, Portugal, Poland and across the African continent. The channel is also streamed live on its website in all three languages. 

The channel signed an agreement enabling it to be broadcast in Germany on Kabel Deutschland. i24NEWS was initially broadcast in the United States via the Jewish Life Television network, but following the acquisition of Cablevision by Drahi-owned Altice USA (formerly Cablevision with a public brand of Optimum), i24NEWS is now broadcast on many US cable and TV operators, among them: Optimum channel 14, Suddenlink channel 49, Mediacom channel 228, Xfinity channel 1118, Spectrum and others.  

i24NEWS English is available in the UK, along with a number of other international news channels, via online video subscription service NewsPlayer+.

In January 2021, i24NEWS became the first Israeli-based channel available in the UAE, on the country's leading content provider Etisalat. Later that year, DU became the second operator to add the channel to its subscribers in the UAE.

Starting October 2021, i24NEWS is available in Australia on Flash streaming service.

News team 

i24NEWS' coverage is to a large extent due to the special make-up of the channel: more than 150 journalists (diplomacy and defense correspondents, anchors, editors, producers and journalists) who hail from 35 different countries and who work together.

i24NEWS English programming 
In addition to up-to-the-minute news, the channel also features a variety of current affairs shows and reports on such subjects as economy, defense, sport, hi-tech and other topics. Culture magazine shows and special interviews are broadcast between the hourly news updates.
i24NEWS Desk: Hourly Flashes. Live news updates throughout the day from around the world.
The Rundown: Calev Ben David breaks down the need-to-know news from around the world in a fast-paced and engaging format. 
Middle East Now: The top news coming out of the Middle East, the burning issues and the strategic, groundbreaking cooperation, with special interviews and the views and voices of those at the center of events. Hosts: Ya'akov Eylon or Laura Cellier.
Global Eye: Global Eye is the window to the world straight from Tel Aviv. Sarah Coats travels through every region of the world, breaking down the most trending and important stories of the day worldwide.
 Zoom In with Jeff Smith: Zooming in on the main headlines of the day, Jeff Smith brings the latest from Israel, the Middle East and the world not forgetting to discuss whatever is trending.
Israel Business Beat with Natasha Kirtchuk: Business Beat is your inside look into the future. Discover the most groundbreaking innovations coming out of Israel and the world, meet the people and entrepreneurs changing our plant, and catch up on the trending news that is shaping today's business. 
Strictly Security: a weekly look into security, intelligence and strategic affairs. The latest on the major international conflicts, as well as an in-depth analysis of the ongoing security issues in the Middle-East and around the globe. Host: Yoav Limor.
Holy Land Uncovered: Holy Land Uncovered is a weekly magazine about faith, religion and the history of the region that takes viewers to places they may not otherwise ever see. Host: Emily Frances.
 Malard at Large: A straightforward one-on-one conversation with a head of state, former head of state, prime minister, decision-maker, as they discuss the issues and geopolitics of the Middle East, North America, Europe, Africa and Asia. Host: Christian Malard.
Ñews24: i24NEWS Spanish weekly magazine with Carlos Gurovich and Damian Pachter.

i24NEWS French programming 

 i24NEWSROOM: Hourly Flashes. Live news updates throughout the day from around the world.
 Le Prime: Daily show with reports and interviews focus on political, diplomatic and economic news in the Middle East. Host: Jean-Charles Banoun.
 Les Grandes Gueules Moyen-Orient: Daily debate show between Tel Aviv, Paris, New York and as far as Dubai to debrief about the news of the day with those who live it. Host: Benjamin Petrover.
 Conversations avec Anna Cabana: One hour of exchange with a guest to understand the wings of power. Host: Anna Cabana. There is a controversy about Anna Cabana in 2022 who is French Education minister Jean-Michel Blanquer’s wife and directed a show while issues about her husband were debated.
 Malard en liberté:  A straightforward one-on-one conversation with a head of state, former head of state, prime minister, decision-maker, as they discuss the issues and geopolitics of the Middle East, North America, Europe, Africa and Asia. Host: Christian Malard.
 Le Grand Oral: Every Sunday, an interview focus on one famous guest, hosted by Benjamin Petrover with 4 columnists in Paris and Tel-Aviv.
 Défense: Magazine dealing with Defense and Security issues in the Middle-East. Host: Matthias Inbar.
 Culture: The journal of arts, shows, books and lifestyle. Host: Valérie Abécassis.
 Histoires et Découvertes: Weekly program about History. Host: Valérie Pérez.
 Conversations avec Nathalie Nagar: Weekly magazine focus on Israeli society. Host: Nathalie Nagar.
 Orient: Weekly magazine focus on Middle-East and Maghreb world. Host: Cyril Amar.
 Afrique: Weekly programm focus on Israeli-African relationships. Host: Jean-Charles Banoun.
 Politique: Weekly show dealing with Israeli politics. Host: Nathalie Nagar.
 Dubai Lifestyle: Short program focus on UAE.

i24NEWS Arabic programming 
 i24NEWS Desk: News from the Middle East and around the world.
STAD 24: A comprehensive sports show focusing on Arab sports news in Israel and the region. The weekly magazine brings the latest on football clubs in the Gulf and the rest of the Arab world and features colorful reports about interesting people and teams that are outside of spotlight.
 ADAAL MASA: Daily News show that focuses on main headlines of the day with guests, debates and reports.
The Debate: A daily debate. 
Eye On The Gulf: A weekly show that sheds an eye on the most important Gulf political and economic issues and headlines, and the most important issues on social networking.
 Madar al Osboa: a weekly show that brings the most interesting events of the week, combining guests in the studio.

Broadcasting
High-definition (HD) broadcasting was started in March 2017 via satellite using Hot Bird 13C-capacities (French and English feed only).

See also 
 I24NEWS (United States)
 International news channels
 Television in Israel

References

External links 

 
 
 
 

2013 establishments in Israel
2013 in Israeli television
24-hour television news channels in France
Arabic-language mass media in Israel
Arabic-language television stations
Companies based in Tel Aviv
English-language television stations
International broadcasters
French-language television stations
Mass media companies of Israel
Mass media in Tel Aviv
Multilingual news services
Television channels and stations established in 2013
Television channels in Israel